In differential equations, the mth-degree caloric polynomial (or heat polynomial) is a "parabolically m-homogeneous" polynomial Pm(x, t) that satisfies the heat equation

 

"Parabolically m-homogeneous" means

 

The polynomial is given by

 

It is unique up to a factor.

With t = −1, this polynomial reduces to the mth-degree Hermite polynomial in x.

References
. Contains an extensive bibliography on various topics related to the heat equation.

External links 

 Zeroes of complex caloric functions and singularities of complex viscous Burgers equation

Differential equations
Polynomials
Partial differential equations